Marion Township is one of the fifteen townships of Noble County, Ohio, United States.  The 2000 census found 730 people in the township, 434 of whom lived in the unincorporated portions of the township.

Geography
Located in the eastern part of the county, it borders the following townships:
Wayne Township - north
Beaver Township - northeast
Seneca Township, Monroe County - east
Franklin Township, Monroe County - southeast corner
Stock Township - south
Center Township - west
Seneca Township - northwest

The village of Summerfield, the second largest village in Noble County, is located in southwestern Marion Township.

Name and history
It is one of twelve Marion Townships statewide.

Government
The township is governed by a three-member board of trustees, who are elected in November of odd-numbered years to a four-year term beginning on the following January 1. Two are elected in the year after the presidential election and one is elected in the year before it. There is also an elected township fiscal officer, who serves a four-year term beginning on April 1 of the year after the election, which is held in November of the year before the presidential election. Vacancies in the fiscal officership or on the board of trustees are filled by the remaining trustees.

References

External links
Noble County Chamber of Commerce 

Townships in Noble County, Ohio
Townships in Ohio